Henry Burton may refer to:

 Henry Burton (Conservative politician) (1876–1947), British Conservative MP for Sudbury (1924–1945)
 Henry Burton (physician) (1799–1849), English physician
 Henry Burton (theologian) (1578–1648), English Puritan
 Henry Burton (South African politician) (1866–1935), cabinet minister in first Union government
 Henry Stanton Burton (1819–1869), American Army officer
 Henry Burton (cricketer) (1874–1964), English cricketer
 Henry Marley Burton (1821–1880), British architect

See also 
 Henry Burton Buckley, 1st Baron Wrenbury, British barrister and judge
 Henry Burton-Peters (1792–1874), English Whig Member of Parliament for Beverley (1830–1837)
 Harry Burton (disambiguation)